Vuillermoz is a surname of Franco-Provençal origin.

Geographical distribution
As of 2014, 59.5% of all known bearers of the surname Vuillermoz were residents of France (frequency 1:45,212), 35.2% of Italy (1:70,351) and 1.7% of Luxembourg (1:13,821).

In France, the frequency of the surname was higher than national average (1:45,212) in the following regions:
 1. Bourgogne-Franche-Comté (1:6,057)
 2. Auvergne-Rhône-Alpes (1:12,866)
 3. New Caledonia (1:17,251)

In Italy, the frequency of the surname was higher than national average (1:70,351) only in one region: Aosta Valley (1:151).

People
Alexis Vuillermoz (born 1988), French cyclist
Émile Vuillermoz (1878–1960), French critic
Michel Vuillermoz (born 1962), French actor and screenwriter
René-Laurent Vuillermoz (born 1977), Italian biathlete

References

Franco-Provençal-language surnames